Peshawar Nights ( Shab-hā-ye Pishāwar) is a written firsthand account by Sultan al-Wa'izin Shirazi ("Prince of Preachers from Shiraz"), recalling ten days of dialogues between two Sunni scholars and a Shia author about major topics relating to Shia Islam, which took place in Peshawar (now in Pakistan, which, at the time, was part of British India) beginning on 27 January 1927. The book was originally written in Persian and published in Tehran and has subsequently been translated into several languages, the first English edition was published in 1977 in Pakistan.

Background 

It recounts a public debate between Shia Muslims and Sunni Muslims, that took place in the city of Peshawar in the North-West Frontier Province of British India (present-day Khyber Pakhtunkhwa, Pakistan) for ten nights beginning on 27 January 1927. The two principal participants from the Sunni side were Hafiz Muhammad Rashid and Sheikh Abdus Salam from Kabul. The discussions were attended by approximately 200 people (Shia and Sunni Muslims) and were recorded by four reporters published following morning in the local newspapers. 
According to the preface:

English editions 

The title of the book is a translation of the original Persian title, Shabhaye-Peshawar. Sinc e its first translation, printing & publishing in English, it been re-translated, re-printed & re-published across the world several times. A few of the major English publications available are:
 A digest by Peermahomed Ebrahim Trust, Pakistan from the 1970s
 A translation by Hamid Quinlan and Charles Ali Campbell, published by Ansariyan Publications, Iran, from the 1990s
 From the UK in the 2000s
 Multiple times in the 2010s:
 In 2013, two parts; Part 1 & Part 2
 In February 2014 
 In September 2014, two parts; Part 1 & Part 2
 In July 2015, two parts; Part 1 & Part 2
 In November 2015, two parts; Part 1 & Part 2
 In 2017, two parts; Part 1 & Part 2
 In 2018

Translations in other languages 
Apart from English, the book has been translated into several other languages from original Persian. It is available in:
 Persian
 English
 Urdu
 Arabic
 Azerbaijani)
 French
 Spanish
 Indonesian. In Indonesian, it was initially translated as Mazhab Syia and was reprinted in 2009 under the title Mazhab Pecinta Keluarga Nabi: Kajian al-Quran dan Sunnah.

Book's coverage 
The book is notable, it has not only been reprinted several times in English by different publishers across the world but also has been translated to several languages and has not only been cited by books but is also used as teaching/reference material in academia and suggested as reading material by others.

Citations and mentions 
The book has been cited or mentioned by later books, journal, etc. including,
 as a reference in book 'The Twelver Shi'a as a Muslim Minority in India: Pulpit of Tears'
 as reference in footnotes in book 'The Suffering of the Ahl ul Bayt and their Followers (Shia) throughout History'
 as a reference in magazine 'The Light, Volumes 24-25'
 in bibliography in book 'Discourses of Mobilization in Post-revolutionary Iran'
 mentioned in text of book 'Shi'ism In South East Asia: Alid Piety and Sectarian Constructions'

Listings 
 listed in "Accessions List, Pakistan, Volume 18, 1979" 
 listed in "Forthcoming Books, Volume 35, Issue 5"
Peshawar Nights has been listed as one of the books "to understand Shia better", it is searchable and downloadable from internet free of charge.

Academia 
The book has not only been catalogued by university libraries cited by books but also is used as teaching/reference material in academia and suggested as reading material,
 it is catalogued in 'The Online Books Page' of the library of University of Pennsylvania.
 it is mentioned as one of the 'contemporary material' suggested for use as teaching/reference material by University at Albany in its The Journal for Multi Media History.
 it is catalogued under 'The Shi'ite Tradition' in the 'Internet Islamic History Sourcebook' of the Fordham University

See also 
 A Shi'i-Sunni dialogue

References

External links 
 Read 'Peshawar Nights' online in - English, Persian, Urdu (part-1), Urdu (part-2), Arabic, French, Azeri, Spanish.
Blog dedicated to Peshawar Nights

Shia literature
Peshawar
Shia theology books